Charlie Jordan Lazzaro (born 25 March 2002) is an Australian rules footballer who plays for  in the Australian Football League (AFL).

Early football
Lazzaro started his junior football at the St Mary's Sporting Club in Geelong, where he played with long time friend and future AFL player Oliver Henry. Lazzaro attended school at The Geelong College in Geelong, where he played his Football in the APS school system. Lazzaro captained the Under 16 Victorian Country Team that played in Gold Coast in 2018.  He also played for the Geelong Falcons in the NAB League, where he totalled 8 games and an average of 20 disposals. It was stated Lazzaro could have gone as low as pick 70 or even below that, bolting to be selected with pick 36 at the 2020 AFL draft.

AFL career
On debut, he collected a singular disposal after only spending 20% of the game on the ground. However, the next week saw him spend 78% of the game on the ground, returning 17 disposals, 3 marks and 4 tackles. It was revealed Lazzaro signed a two-year contract-extension with the team on 10 June 2021.

Statistics
 Statistics are correct to the end of round 10 2021.

|- style="background-color: #EAEAEA"
! scope="row" style="text-align:center" | 2021
|
| 35 || 9 || 2 || 3 || 50 || 34 || 84 || 21 || 20 || 0.2 || 0.3 || 5.6 || 3.8 || 9.3 || 2.3 || 2.2
|- class="sortbottom"
! colspan=3| Career
! 9
! 2
! 3
! 50
! 34
! 84
! 21
! 20
! 0.2
! 0.3
! 5.6
! 3.8
! 9.3
! 2.3
! 2.2
|}

References

2002 births
Living people
North Melbourne Football Club players
Geelong Falcons players
Australian rules footballers from Victoria (Australia)